"5 Minutes" is a 1978 single by English band The Stranglers. The song is sung by bassist Jean-Jacques Burnel. It gives an account of a rape that occurred at a shared flat in London he lived in during 1977. The lyrics, which are sung both in English and French, convey Burnell's frustrations over finding the five men who committed the attack.

The song was recorded in between No More Heroes and Black and White. It reached number 11 in the UK Singles Chart.

Background 
In 1977, Burnel was living in a London flat with Wilko Johnson, then the guitarist of the band Dr. Feelgood, as well as a female employee of the Sex Pistols. One night, while Burnel was playing a concert with The Stranglers, his flatmate was raped, an event so traumatizing that Burnel left the apartment soon after.

The title of the song refers to Burnel's apartment being located in a dangerous area of London just five minutes away from The Bishops Avenue, one of the wealthiest streets in the world, and the juxtaposition of the two communities.

The lyric "some say that I should hate them all," according to Burnel, refers to how people used the fact that the five rapists were black men as an excuse for racism.

Charts

References

External links
 

The Stranglers songs
1978 singles
Song recordings produced by Martin Rushent
1978 songs
United Artists Records singles
Songs about sexual assault
Songs written by Hugh Cornwell
Songs written by Jean-Jacques Burnel
Songs written by Dave Greenfield
Songs written by Jet Black